Mayday, like the former Love Parade, is one of the oldest and most reputed electronic music festivals in Germany, having its debut on 1991 and Katowice, Poland, having its debut on 2000. Despite the name, Mayday festivals date oscillates between April and December (these being called Winter Mayday). Currently, the festival takes place only in around 30 April in Dortmund and 10 November in Katowice.

Mayday reflects and determines actual trends in techno music within present year.

Each Mayday has a theme. Until 2013 it was composed by Members of Mayday, DJs WestBam and Klaus Jankuhn.

Since 1998 Mayday (Germany) is supported by eve&rave Münster e.V. with drug-information-desks.

Although they were pioneers as leaders of techno music in Central Europe in their early days, in recent years Mayday has opened up to new sounds, from hardstyle to house, trance and EDM.

List of Mayday events
Attendance figures are estimated.

Gallery

See also

List of electronic music festivals
Culture Flash

References

External links

 Mayday
 Mayday (History)
 Mayday Bosnia
 Mayday Poland
 Mayday Russia
 Mayday Hungary
 Mayday Poland 2005  Gallery
 Report about Mayday 2009
 Report about Mayday 2010
 Report about Mayday 2011

Electronic music festivals in Germany
Music festivals established in 1991
Techno
1991 establishments in Germany